Anglo-Egyptian Oilfields Ltd was an oil company was registered in London on 6 July 1911 based on oilfields in Egypt.

The company was a joint operation of Royal Dutch Shell and British Petroleum.
  
In July 1961 the government of the United Arab Republic acquired 50% shareholding of the company. It was renamed as the Al Nasr Oilfields Company on 4 January 1962, and was converted into a United Arab Republic Company. It seems to have been nationalised in 1964, and news reports cite Nasser's seizing in 1964 while Skinner's Oil and petroleum year book suggests 1951 control.

The oilfields utilised were the Hurghada and the Ras Gharib, on the western shore of the Red Sea. It also held a joint leases in the Sinai peninsula. It had a refinery at Suez.

References

External links
 

Defunct oil and gas companies of the United Kingdom
1911 establishments in England
Former Shell plc subsidiaries
Former BP subsidiaries
Energy companies established in 1911
British companies established in 1911